Otto Klineberg (2 November 1899, in Quebec City, Quebec, Canada – 6 March 1992, in Bethesda, Maryland) was a Canadian born psychologist.
He held professorships in social psychology at Columbia University and the University of Paris. His pioneering work in the 1930s on the intelligence of white and black students in the United States and his evidence as an expert witness in Delaware were instrumental in winning the Supreme Court school segregation case Brown v. Board of Education in 1954. Through his work in UNESCO and elsewhere, he helped to promote psychology internationally.

Career
Born in Quebec City, Klineberg was raised in Montreal. He obtained a Bachelor's degree from McGill University in 1919, a Master's degree in philosophy from Harvard University in 1920, a medical degree from McGill in 1925 and a Ph.D. in psychology from Columbia University in 1927. He remained at Columbia as chairman of the newly created department of social psychology. There, he was influenced by Franz Boas, a German anthropologist who created the cultural anthropology doctoral program at Columbia.

In 1929, he began research about the psychological differences between African Americans and Native Americans, which, though controversial at the time, helped to correct prior beliefs of race-based inferiority. Klineberg's research focused greatly on race problems, minorities, immigrants, nationality, and other topics related to culture and personality. In 1931, his views that there was no scientific basis for racial superiority was controversial.

He married Selma Gintzler in 1933, with whom he had a daughter and two sons. Klineberg was a polyglot and spoke English, German, Chinese in addition to the major Romance Languages.

In the 1950s and early 1960s, Klineberg held a senior post in the social sciences in UNESCO. He helped found the International Social Science Council and the International Union of Psychological Science, on which he served on the executive committee (1951–1969), as secretary-general (1955–1960) and as president (1960–1963).

From 1961 to 1982 he was professor at the University of Paris, where he directed the International Center for Intergroup Relations until 1982.

In 1963 Klineberg was president of the 17th International Congress of Psychology, held in Washington DC. He was also president of the World Federation for Mental Health, the Inter-America Society of Psychology, the Eastern Psychological Association of the United States and 
the Society for the Psychological Study of Social Issues.

On his retirement to Manhattan in 1982, he taught part-time at the City University of New York until 1990. He died following a brief period of Parkinson's disease.

Awards and honors
National Research Council Fellowship, 1928
Butler Medal, Columbia University, 1950
Kurt Lewin Memorial Award, 1956
Honorary Ph.D., University of Brazil, Rio de Janeiro, 1958
Honorary Ph.D., Howard University, Washington DC, 1961
Honorary Ph.D., Drew University, Madison, Wisconsin, 1972
Medal, University of Liège, Belgium, 1974
Annual award, International Society for Educational, Cultural and Scientific Interchanges, 1978
American Psychological Association Distinguished Award for Contributions of Psychology in the Public Interest, 1979
Award from Brazil, Contributions to the development of psychology in Brazil, 1979
Honorary life member, New York Academy of Science, 1983
Social Psychology Award, New York State Psychological Association, 1984
APF Gold Medal Award, Lifetime Contribution of a Psychologist in the Public Interest, 1985
American Psychological Association Award for Distinguished Contributions to the International Advancement of Psychology, 1991

Selected bibliography
 Experimental study of speed and others factors in ″racial″ differences, New York, 1928.
 Negro intelligence and selective migration, Columbia University Press, 1935.
 Race differences, New York : Harper and brothers, 1935.
 Characteristics of the American Negro. Harper and brothers, 1944
 Social psychology, H. Holt and Company, 1948
 Tensions Affecting International Understanding. A Survey of Research. Social Science Research Council, 1950
 Race and psychology, Paris : UNESCO, 1951.
 Nationalism and tribalism among African students. A study of social identity (with Marisa Zavalloni), 1969.
 Étudiants du Tiers-monde en Europe. Problèmes d'adaptation, une étude effectuée en Autriche, en France, aux Pays-Bas et en Yougoslavie (with Jeanne Ben Brika), Paris : Mouton, 1972.
 Vers une meilleure compréhension internationale : l'apport contemporain de la psychologie, Éditions Inter-nationales, Paris, 1974.
 International educational exchange : an assessment of its nature and its prospects, (with Heine von Alemann) École des hautes études en sciences sociales, Paris, 1976.

References

1899 births
1992 deaths
Canadian psychologists
McGill University alumni
Harvard University alumni
Columbia University faculty
Academic staff of the University of Paris
People from Quebec City
Columbia University alumni
McGill University Faculty of Medicine alumni
20th-century psychologists
Canadian emigrants to the United States